Bugtussle is an unincorporated community on the southern shores of Lake Eufaula, in Pittsburg County, Oklahoma, United States, approximately 30 miles (48 km) west of Robbers Cave State Park, with a population of "a few hundred".

History
The community began in 1903 when Ran Woods and others constructed a two-room log schoolhouse on the site. The schoolhouse, no longer standing, was once attended by former Speaker of the US House Carl Albert. The settlement was allegedly named by Woods, who felt that the bugs at the site were so numerous that they were an endless "tussle". It was renamed Flowery Mound circa 1907, but the original name persisted. At the time of its founding, Bugtussle was in Tobucksy County, Choctaw Nation, in the Indian Territory.

Notable person
 Carl Albert (Speaker of the United States House of Representatives, 1971–1977, highest government post attained by any Oklahoman)

References

Unincorporated communities in Pittsburg County, Oklahoma
Unincorporated communities in Oklahoma
Populated places established in 1903
1903 establishments in Indian Territory